Harris v. McRae, 448 U.S. 297 (1980), was a case in which the Supreme Court of the United States held that states participating in Medicaid are not required to fund medically necessary abortions for which federal reimbursement was unavailable as a result of the Hyde Amendment, which restricted the use of federal funds for abortion. The Court also held that the funding restrictions of the Hyde Amendment did not violate the Fifth Amendment or the Establishment Clause of the First Amendment.

Background 
In 1965, the US Congress amended Title XIX of the Social Security Act to create Medicaid, a voluntary program to provide federal funds to states that choose to provide reimbursement for certain medical expenses for the indigent.

In September 1976, Congress began to ban the use of federal funds to reimburse the cost of abortions under Medicaid. Initially, the only exception was if the life of the mother would be endangered by the fetus being carried to term.  The restrictions became known as the Hyde Amendment, after the measure's original sponsor, Illinois Representative Henry Hyde. The language of the 1980 Hyde Amendment provided:

In 1976, after the passage of the original Hyde Amendment, an action was brought in the United States District Court for the Eastern District of New York that sought to enjoin enforcement of its restrictions. The plaintiffs were Cora McRae, a New York Medicaid recipient who was in the first trimester of a pregnancy that she wished to abort; the New York City Health and Hospitals Corp., which operated hospitals providing abortion services; officers of the Women's Division of the Board of Global Ministries of the United Methodist Church; and the Women's Division itself. McRae sought to bring the action as a class action on behalf of other similarly-situated women. The District Court granted the class certification motion and permitted US Senators James L. Buckley and Jesse Helms as well as Hyde to intervene as defendants.

The district court granted the injunction on January 15, 1980 and found that the Hyde Amendment violated the Fifth Amendment's Due Process Clause and the First Amendment's Establishment Clause.

Supreme Court decision
Justice Stewart delivered the opinion of the Court in which Chief Justice Burger, Justice White, Justice Powell, and Justice Rehnquist joined. Justice White wrote an opinion concurring the judgment.  Justice Brennan wrote a dissent to which Justice Marshall and Justice Blackmun joined. Justice Marshall and Justice Blackmun also wrote separate dissents, and Justice Stevens did so as well.

The Court held that states participating in the Medicaid program were not obligated to fund medically-necessary abortions under Title XIX. The Court found that a woman's freedom of choice does not carry with it "a constitutional entitlement to the financial resources to avail herself of the full range of protected choices." The Court ruled that because the Equal Protection Clause is not a source of substantive rights and because poverty does not qualify as a "suspect classification," the Hyde Amendment does not violate the Fifth Amendment. Finally, the Court held that the coincidence of the funding restrictions of the statute with tenets of the Roman Catholic Church does not constitute an establishment of religion.

See also
List of United States Supreme Court cases, volume 448

References

External links
 

United States Supreme Court cases
United States abortion case law
1980 in United States case law
Medicare and Medicaid (United States)
United States Supreme Court cases of the Burger Court